Wolska (lit. Wola Street) is the main artery of Warsaw's borough of Wola. Initially Wola district was but a western suburb of Warsaw and a road leading to it was dubbed "droga wolska" - Wola road. In 1725 parts of that road closest to the Warsaw Old Town, located along the Saxon Axis, were officially renamed to "Aleja Wolska" - Wola Avenue. In modern times it starts at a crossing of Chłodna and Towarowa Streets, and runs as a continuation of Solidarity Avenue through the neighbourhoods of Młynów, Czyste and Ulrychów, all the way to Połczyńska Street.

Streets in Warsaw